{{DISPLAYTITLE:C16H19ClN2}}
The molecular formula C16H19ClN2 (molar mass: 274.79 g/mol, exact mass: 274.1237 u) may refer to:

 Chlorphenamine, or chlorpheniramine
 Dexchlorpheniramine

Molecular formulas